Madagaster is a genus of Madagascan plants in the tribe Astereae within the family Asteraceae.

 Species
 Madagaster andohahelensis (Humbert) G.L.Nesom
 Madagaster madagascariensis (Humbert) G.L.Nesom
 Madagaster mandrarensis (Humbert) G.L.Nesom
 Madagaster saboureaui (Humbert) G.L.Nesom
 Madagaster senecionoides (Baker) G.L.Nesom

References

Asteraceae genera
Astereae
Endemic flora of Madagascar